Bhim Hang Limboo is an Indian politician. He was elected to the Sikkim Legislative Assembly from Yangthang in the 2019 Sikkim Legislative Assembly election as a member of the Sikkim Krantikari Morcha. He is Minister of Public health engineering and Water security, Water resources & River development in P. S. Golay Cabinet.

References

1989 births
Living people
Sikkim Krantikari Morcha politicians
People from Gyalshing district
Sikkim MLAs 2019–2024
University of North Bengal alumni
Limbu people